Batuwatta is a town situated approximately 4 km from Ganemulla town. It belongs to the Ja-Ela electorate.

Ja-Ela